Anthony Stavros Ricca (born 3 March 1986), most known as Antonis Rikka, is a Greek former professional footballer who played as a defensive midfielder.

Club career

Marseille
Born in Marseille, France, Rikka started his career in the city's biggest club, Olympique de Marseille.

Skoda Xanthi
After not beeing able to establish himself at Marseille, Rikka was released and joined Skoda Xanthi on 4 February 2006, making 4 appearances until the end of the season. Then, he joined on loan Niki Volos, a Beta Ethniki team, in order to gain more experiences. He stayed with them for the 2006–07 season, participating in 29 league games. Although his team finished last and relegated, his performances were good enough to make the Skoda Xanthi coach Emilio Ferrera trust him with a place in the following year's squad. Rikka grabbed the opportunity and having played 23 league games was one of the team's best players.

AEK Athens
On 16 May 2008, Rikka signed a five-year contract for Greek Super League runners-up side AEK Athens for €600,000, but did not manage to impress AEK's trainers in his first season and managed only three appearances, due to a serious injury. After two consecutive seasons on loan, he returned to AEK.

Loan to Olympiakos Volos
On 1 June 2010, Rikka joined Olympiacos Volos on loan for one season.

Loan to Kerkyra
On 16 January 2011, Rikka joined Kerkyra on loan until the end of the season.

Second stint in AEK
In August 2011, Rikka returned to AEK Athens, but he was not at Jimenez plans. When Kostenoglou took charge in AEK, he considered his senior squad and he finally decided to keep Rikka. On 19 November, he came on as a second-half substitute against Asteras Tripolis and he made a comeback. In that whole season, Rikka made 13 appearances.

Red Star
On 4 July 2013, Rikka joined Red Star after his contract with AEK was terminated.

Football League (Greece)
In 2014, he played in the Football League for Aiginiakos and then AO Chania.

References

External links

Living people
1986 births
Footballers from Marseille
Association football midfielders
Greek footballers
Greek expatriate footballers
Expatriate footballers in France
French people of Greek descent
Super League Greece players
Championnat National players
Olympique de Marseille players
Xanthi F.C. players
Niki Volos F.C. players
AEK Athens F.C. players
Olympiacos Volos F.C. players
AO Chania F.C. players
A.O. Kerkyra players
Red Star F.C. players